Nebraska Highway 4 is a highway in Nebraska.  The entirety of the route is in Nebraska's southern tier of counties.  Beatrice is the only city with over 1,000 in population on the highway.  Its western terminus is at an intersection with US 6 and US 34 southwest of Atlanta.  Its eastern terminus is at an intersection with US 75 north of Dawson.

Route description
Nebraska Highway 4 begins at an intersection near around the Atlanta area with U.S. Highways 6 and 34. It proceeds east into farmland and meets U.S. Highway 183 near Ragan. It then passes through Ragan and Campbell and meets US 281 in northern Webster County. It continues through Lawrence, is briefly concurrent with Nebraska Highway 14 and continues straight east through Davenport and Carleton until it meets US 81. It continues north for one mile (1.6 km) with US 81 and separates at Bruning. It goes east through Daykin and is briefly concurrent with Nebraska Highway 15 for one mile (1.6 km). It passes through Plymouth, Nebraska, passes near the Homestead National Monument and meets US 136 on the west edge of Beatrice. It is concurrent with US 136 through Beatrice and the two routes separate near Filley. It turns briefly southeast toward Virginia and Lewiston, and briefly turns south until it meets NE 99. It turns east, briefly overlaps Nebraska Highway 50 and continues east toward Table Rock. At Table Rock, it intersects NE 65 and continues eastward through Humboldt until it ends at U.S. Highway 75 near Dawson.

Major intersections

References

External links

The Nebraska Highways Page: Highways 1 to 30
Nebraska Roads: NE 1-10

004
Transportation in Harlan County, Nebraska
Transportation in Franklin County, Nebraska
Transportation in Webster County, Nebraska
Transportation in Nuckolls County, Nebraska
Transportation in Thayer County, Nebraska
Transportation in Jefferson County, Nebraska
Transportation in Gage County, Nebraska
Transportation in Pawnee County, Nebraska
Transportation in Richardson County, Nebraska